Ricaurte is a town and parish in Cuenca Canton, Azuay Province, Ecuador. The parish covers an area of 14.3 km² and according to the 2001 Ecuadorian census it had a population total of 14,006.

On July 11, 1983 a Transportes Aereos Militares Ecuatorianos (TAME) Boeing 737-200 passenger flight, which was serving the scheduled Quito-Cuenca route, crashed into Ricaurte's Bashún Hill while on final approach for Cuenca's Mariscal Lamar International Airport. All 119 passengers were killed, making it the deadliest aviation accident in Ecuadorian history to date.

References

Populated places in Azuay Province
Parishes of Ecuador